The 2016 Clemson Tigers women's soccer team represented Clemson University during the 2016 NCAA Division I women's soccer season.  The Tigers were led by head coach Ed Radwanski, in his sixth season.  Home games were played at Riggs Field. Clemson opened the season ranked 14th in the NSCAA Preseason Poll.

The Lady Tigers finished as ACC regular season co-champions with Notre Dame, capturing the second ACC regular season title in program history. Clemson also advanced to the third round (Sweet 16) of the NCAA tournament for the first time since 2006.

Coach Ed Radwanski was named ACC coach of the year in his sixth season with the team.

Roster

Updated August 8, 2016

Clemson had four players earn All – ACC postseason awards.  Kailen Sheridan and Catrina Atanda were named first team All – ACC, Sam Staab was named second team All – ACC, and Claire Wagner was named third team All – ACC.  For the 2016 Clemson named 4 co-captains for the team.  Gabby Byorth, Emily Byorth, Abby Jones, and Claire Wagner (seniors) were named captains.

Draft picks
The Tigers had three players drafted in the 2017 NWSL College Draft.

Schedule

|-
!colspan=6 style=""| Exhibition

|-
!colspan=6 style=""| Regular season

|-
!colspan=6 style=""| ACC Tournament

|-
!colspan=6 style=""| NCAA Tournament

Rankings

References

External links

Clemson
Clemson men's soccer
Clemson
Clemson Tigers women's soccer seasons